Playback or Play Back may refer to:

Film
 Playback (1962 film), a British film in the Edgar Wallace Mysteries series
 Playback, a 1996 film starring Shannon Whirry
 Playback (2012 film), an American horror film by Michael A. Nickles
 Play Back, a 2021 Indian Telugu-language film

Literature
 Playback (magazine), a Canadian film, TV, and new media trade publication
 Playback (novel), by Raymond Chandler, also a screenplay

Music
 Gapless playback, uninterrupted play of audio tracks
 Playback singer, a singer in films whose singing is prerecorded, who lip syncs (see also lip-synching in music)

Performers
 Playback (South Korean group), a girl group
 Playback, an American boyband that competed in season 2 of the U.S. X Factor
 Playback, credited performers in the U.S. of the 1979 Player One song "Space Invaders"

Albums
 Playback (The Appletree Theatre album), 1968
 Playback (Phi Life Cypher album), 2006
 Playback (Sam Lazar album), 1962
 Playback (SSQ album), 1983
 Playback (Tom Petty and the Heartbreakers album), 1995
 Playback: The Brian Wilson Anthology, 2017

Songs
 "Playback", by Carlos Paião, representing Portugal at the Eurovision Song Contest 1981
 "Playback", by NCT 127 from 2 Baddies, 2022

Other uses
 Playback (technique), a chaos magic technique
 Playback attack, or replay attack, a type of network attack
 Playback FM, a fictional radio station in the video game Grand Theft Auto: San Andreas
 Playback Theatre, a form of improvisational theatre

See also
 
 Record (disambiguation)
 Replay (disambiguation)